
Gmina Frombork is an urban-rural gmina (administrative district) in Braniewo County, Warmian-Masurian Voivodeship, in northern Poland.

Neighbouring gminas
Gmina Frombork is bordered by the gminas of Braniewo, Młynary, Płoskinia and Tolkmicko. It also lies next to the Vistula Lagoon.

Villages
The gmina contains the following villages having the status of sołectwo: Baranówka, Biedkowo, Bogdany, Drewnowo, Jędrychowo, Krzyżewo, Krzywiec, Narusa, Ronin and Wierzno Wielkie.

There is also the village of Nowiny, which does not have the status of sołectwo.

References
 Polish official population figures 2006

Frombork
Braniewo County